Callerya nitida is a species of flowering plant in the family Fabaceae, native to south-central and southeast mainland China, Hainan and Taiwan. It was first described by George Bentham in 1842 as Millettia nitida.

Callerya nitida produces a number of compounds among which genistein-8-C-β-D-apiofuranosyl-(1→6)-O-β-D-glucopyranoside, calycosin, isoliquiritigenin, formononetin, gliricidin, 8-O-methylretusin, dihydrokaempferol, biochanin, afromosin and hirsutissimiside F interact with thrombin, while sphaerobioside, formononetin-7-O-β-D-apiofuranosyl-(1→6)-O-β-d-glucopyranoside, genistein-5-methylether-7-O-α-L-rhamnopyranosyl-(1→6)-O-β-D-glucopyranoside, retusin-7,8-O-β-D-diglucopyranoside, symplocoside, ononin, genistin, afromosin-7-O-β-D-glucopyranoside, lanceolarin, liquiritigenin, 7,2-dihydroxy,4-methoxyisoflavan and sphaerobioside have no binding to thrombin.

References

Wisterieae
Flora of South-Central China
Flora of Southeast China
Flora of Hainan
Flora of Taiwan
Plants described in 1842
Fabales of Asia